Tutta Rolf (born Solveig Jenny Berntzen; 7 October 1907 – 26 October 1994) was a Norwegian-Swedish film and theatre actress and singer. Born in Oslo. She appeared in 14 films between 1932 and 1939. She was married three times, firstly to Swedish actor and singer Ernst Rolf (1930–1932) and then to American director Jack Donohue (1936–1950) and finally to Swedish director/actor Hasse Ekman (1953–1972). She was the mother of Academy Award-winning film editor Tom Rolf and actress Jill Donahue.

Selected filmography
 Paramount on Parade (1930) with husband Ernst Rolf in Scandinavian version
 Servant's Entrance (1932)
 Lucky Devils (1932)
 Love and Deficit (1932)
 Dear Relatives (1933)
 Fasters millioner (1934)
 En stille flirt (1933)
 En stilla flirt (1934)
 Under False Flag (1935)
 Dressed to Thrill (1935)
 Swedenhielms (1935)
 Adventure (1936)
 Sara Learns Manners (1937)
 The Great Love (1938)
 Dollar (1938)
 Variety Is the Spice of Life (1939)
 Whalers (1939)

Further reading

External links

1907 births
1994 deaths
Swedish film actresses
Norwegian film actresses
20th-century Swedish actresses
20th-century Norwegian women